Malcolm George Dyer-Edwardes Leslie, 20th Earl of Rothes (8 February 1902 – 17 May 1975) was a Scottish nobleman, and the head of Clan Leslie. He was the Earl of Rothes from 1927 until 1975, following the death of his father, Norman Leslie, 19th Earl of Rothes.

Early life
Malcolm George Dyer-Edwardes Leslie was born on 8 February 1902 in Kensington. His father was Norman Leslie, 19th Earl of Rothes, a Scottish nobleman.

Marriage and children
On 17 July 1926, he married Beryl Dugdale, daughter of Lionel Dugdale of Crathorne, a former High Sheriff of Yorkshire, and sister of Thomas Dugdale, 1st Baron Crathorne.

They had three children:
 Lady Jean Leslie (1927–2017). Married in 1949 to Roderick Mackenzie. 
 Lady Evelyn Leslie (1929–2011). Married in 1949 to Sir Gerard William Mackworth-Young. 
 Ian Lionel Malcolm Leslie, 21st Earl of Rothes (1932–2005). Married in 1955 to Marigold Evans-Bevan.

His son succeeded him in 1975 as the Earl of Rothes.

Career
He worked as Chairman of the National Mutual Life Assurance Society.

He succeeded as the 20th Earl of Rothes on the death of his father in 1927. He served as a Representative Peer for Scotland until this system was abolished.

Death and legacy
The Earl died on 7 May 1975. The Rothes Chair in Preventive Ophthalmology was established at London University in his memory in 1977.

References

1902 births
1975 deaths
20
Scottish representative peers